Big Sandy Regional Airport (former FAA LID: K22) is a public use airport in southwest Martin County, Kentucky. The airport is ten miles (17 km) northeast of Prestonsburg, a city in Floyd County.

Facilities
Its single runway, 3/21, is 5,000 by 100 feet (1,524 x 30 m).

In the year ending September 21, 2006 the airport had 6,400 aircraft operations, average 17 per day: 81% general aviation, 14% air taxi and 5% military. 17 aircraft were then based at the airport: 76% single-engine, 6% multi-engine, 6% jet and 12% helicopter.

References

External links 
 
 

Airports in Kentucky
Buildings and structures in Martin County, Kentucky